

The 2001 NHL Entry Draft was the 39th NHL Entry Draft. It was held on June 23 and 24, 2001 at the National Car Rental Center in Sunrise, Florida.

As of 2022, the only remaining active players in the NHL from the 2001 draft class are Mike Smith and Craig Anderson.

Final central scouting rankings

Skaters

Goaltenders

Selections by round

Teams are in North America unless otherwise noted.

Round one

Round two

Round three

Round four

Round five

Round six

Round seven

Round eight

Round nine

Draft by nationality

See also
2001–02 NHL season
List of NHL first overall draft choices
List of NHL players

References

External links 
 prosportstransactions.com: 2001 NHL Entry Draft Pick Transactions
 2001 NHL Entry Draft player stats at The Internet Hockey Database

National Hockey League Entry Draft
NHL Entry Draft
Draft
National Hockey League in Florida
Sunrise, Florida
NHL Entry Draft